Sergiu Robert Ciocan (born 22 September 1998) is a Romanian professional footballer who plays as a midfielder for Liga II side Minaur Baia Mare.

Honours
Minaur Baia Mare
Liga III: 2021–22

References

External links
 
 
 Sergiu Robert Ciocan at lpf.ro

1998 births
Living people
Sportspeople from Baia Mare
Romanian footballers
Association football midfielders
Liga I players
Liga III players
CS Academica Recea players
CS Gaz Metan Mediaș players
CS Minaur Baia Mare (football) players